Burak Bilgin (born 19 July 1992) is a German footballer who plays for SV Darmstadt 98. He made his 3. Liga debut for the club in November 2011, as a substitute for Oliver Heil in a 4–0 win over Carl Zeiss Jena.

External links

1992 births
Living people
German people of Turkish descent
SV Darmstadt 98 players
3. Liga players
German footballers
Association football forwards
Sportspeople from Darmstadt